Marie Lake is a lake in Alberta. It lies just northwest of the larger Cold Lake. This lake is a beautiful green color water with some of the best fishing in the province.
Sightings of pike larger than a man have been noted by divers in the area. Divers also claim to have spotted mammoth tusks near a crashed ww2 cargo plane rumored to be carrying smuggled gold 

Municipal District of Bonnyville No. 87
Marie Lake